Deloneura is a genus of butterflies in the family Lycaenidae, endemic to the Afrotropics.

Species
Deloneura abri Congdon & Collins, 1998
Deloneura barca (Grose-Smith, 1901)
Deloneura immaculata Trimen, 1868
Deloneura millari Trimen, 1906
Deloneura ochrascens (Neave, 1904)
Deloneura sheppardi Stevenson, 1934
Deloneura subfusca Hawker-Smith, 1933

External links
Deloneura at funet

 
Poritiinae
Lycaenidae genera
Taxa named by Roland Trimen
Taxonomy articles created by Polbot